The following radio stations broadcast on AM frequency 1500 kHz: The Federal Communications Commission categorizes 1500 AM as a U.S. clear-channel frequency. WFED Washington, D.C. and KSTP St. Paul are the dominant Class A stations on 1500 AM.

Argentina
 LT22 in Pehuajo, Buenos Aires (Defunct)
 LRI208 in Lavallol, Buenos Aires
 LT45 in San Javier, Misiones (Defunct?)
 LU1 in Melchor Romero, Buenos Aires
 LT34 in Zarate, Buenos Aires

Mexico
 XEDF-AM in Mexico City
 XEFL-AM in Guanajuato City, Guanajuato

United States
Stations in bold are clear-channel stations.

References

Lists of radio stations by frequency